is a passenger railway station  located in the town of Hino, Tottori Prefecture, Japan. It is operated by the West Japan Railway Company (JR West).

Lines

Station layout
The station consists of two opposed ground-level side platforms connected with the station building by a footbridge. The station is unattended.

Platforms

Adjacent stations

History
Kurosaka Station opened on November 10, 1922. With the privatization of the Japan National Railways (JNR) on April 1, 1987, the station came under the aegis of the West Japan Railway Company.

Passenger statistics
In fiscal 2018, the station was used by an average of 48 passengers daily.

Surrounding area
 Hino Town Kurosaka Elementary School
 Tottori Prefectural Hino High School Kurosaka Facility

See also
List of railway stations in Japan

References

External links 

 Kurosaka Station from JR-Odekake.net 

Railway stations in Tottori Prefecture
Stations of West Japan Railway Company
Hakubi Line
Railway stations in Japan opened in 1922
Hino, Tottori